LaVerne Clark is an American mixed martial artist and a former professional boxer. Clark is a veteran of the Ultimate Fighting Championship, Maximum Fighting Championship and World Fighting Alliance. Clark holds a professional record of 27–21–1, with notable wins over Mac Danzig, Fabiano Iha, and Shonie Carter. He was the first professional boxer to be successful in the UFC.

Mixed martial arts career

Ultimate Fighting Championship
Clark is a UFC veteran, whose history with the promotion dates back to the early beginnings of his career. He made his UFC debut just three fights into his career, facing Josh Stewart at UFC 16 on March 13, 1998, and won via strikes. He returned just under a year later, and faced Frank Caracci at UFC 18 on January 8, 1999. Clark won via submission (strikes), advancing his UFC record to 2–0.

After winning another fight in the Extreme Boxing promotion, Clark returned at UFC 20 against Fabiano Iha on May 7, 1999, defeating Iha by TKO (cut). Clark would fight in the UFC two more times, defeating Koji Oishi at UFC 25 via majority decision, and losing to Fabiano Iha at UFC 27 in a rematch via armbar, leaving the promotion with a record of 4 wins and 1 loss.

Mixed martial arts record

|-
| Loss
| align=center| 27–21–1
| Mark Stoddard
| Submission (verbal)
| Caged Aggression 12: Night Two
| 
| align=center| 1
| align=center| 1:43
| Davenport, Iowa, United States
|
|-
| Loss
| align=center| 27–20–1
| Evan Vasquez Matus
| Submission (triangle choke)
| CBB: Coco Beach Brawl
| 
| align=center| 1
| align=center| 4:59
| Guanacaste, Costa Rica
|
|-
| Loss
| align=center| 27–19–1
| Brian Foster
| Submission (armbar)
| Capital City Cage Wars 7
| 
| align=center| 1
| align=center| 2:31
| Springfield, Illinois, United States
| 
|-
| Win
| align=center| 27–18–1
| Sean Salmon
| KO (punches)
| Fight Tour
| 
| align=center| 1
| align=center| 3:22
| Rockford, Illinois, United States
| 
|-
| Loss
| align=center| 26–18–1
| Sean Huffman
| DQ
| Blueblood MMA: Trials of a Gladiator 9
| 
| align=center| N/A
| align=center| N/A
| Iowa, United States
| 
|-
| Win
| align=center| 26–17–1
| Evan Marks
| Submission (rear-naked choke)
| Blueblood MMA: Trials of a Gladiator 6
| 
| align=center| 1
| align=center| 3:38
| Iowa, United States
| 
|-
| Loss
| align=center| 25–17–1
| Ryan Ford
| Submission (guillotine choke)
| MFC 18: Famous
| 
| align=center| 2
| align=center| 2:30
| Edmonton, Alberta, Canada
| 
|-
| Win
| align=center| 25–16–1
| Matt Kelly
| TKO
| CFC 12: Courage Fighting Championships 12
| 
| align=center| 1
| align=center| 1:57
| Decatur, Illinois, United States
| 
|-
| Win
| align=center| 24–16–1
| Aaron Smith
| Submission (strikes)
| CFC 11: Courage Fighting Championships 11
| 
| align=center| 1
| align=center| 3:32
| Champaign, Illinois, United States
| 
|-
| Win
| align=center| 23–16–1
| Zeke Shiling
| Submission (rear naked choke)
| CFC 9: Courage Fighting Championships 9
| 
| align=center| 1
| align=center| 0:26
| Indiana, United States
| 
|-
| Loss
| align=center| 22–16–1
| Aaron Wetherspoon
| Submission (armbar)
| KOTC: Sinister
| 
| align=center| 1
| align=center| 3:10
| California, United States
| 
|-
| Loss
| align=center| 22–15–1
| Chris Wilson
| Submission (triangle choke)
| SF 17: Hot Zone
| 
| align=center| 1
| align=center| 3:51
| Oregon, United States
| 
|-
| Win
| align=center| 22–14–1
| Victor Moreno
| Decision (unanimous)
| KOTC: Redemption on the River
| 
| align=center| 3
| align=center| 5:00
| Illinois, United States
| 
|-
| Win
| align=center| 21–14–1
| Jamie Woods
| KO
| CFC 4: Courage Fighting Championships 4
| 
| align=center| 1
| 
| Illinois, United States
| 
|-
| Loss
| align=center| 20–14–1
| Jake Ellenberger
| Submission (triangle choke)
| KOTC 64: Raging Bull
| 
| align=center| 2
| align=center| 3:06
| Ohio, United States
| 
|-
| Win
| align=center| 20–13–1
| Cruz Chacon
| TKO
| EC 65: Extreme Challenge 65
| 
| align=center| 1
| align=center| 3:35
| Medina, Minn
| 
|-
| Win
| align=center| 19–13–1
| Jake Jetter
| Submission (armbar)
| XFO 7: Xtreme Fighting Organization 7
| 
| align=center| 1
| align=center| 1:53
| Illinois, United States
| 
|-
|  Draw
| align=center| 18–13–1
| Melvin Guillard
| Draw
| RCF: Dual in the Delta
| 
| align=center| 3
| 
| Mississippi, United States
| 
|-
| Win
| align=center| 18–13
| John Moore
| Submission (arm triangle choke)
| ICE 11: ICE XI
| 
| align=center| 1
| align=center| 2:04
| Ohio, United States
| 
|-
| Win
| align=center| 17–13
| Kevin Knabjan
| KO
| CFC 1: Courage Fighting Championships 1
| 
| align=center| 2
| align=center| 0:10
| Illinois, United States
| 
|-
| Loss
| align=center| 16–13
| Buck Greer
| Submission (triangle choke)
| PXC 2: Chaos
| 
| align=center| 2
| align=center| 1:03
| Guam
| 
|-
| Loss
| align=center| 16–12
| Jorge Santiago
| Submission (triangle choke)
| HFC 2: Hardcore Fighting Championships 2
| 
| align=center| 1
| align=center| 2:17
| Massachusetts, United States
| 
|-
| Win
| align=center| 16–11
| Mac Danzig
| Decision (unanimous)
| EC 54: Extreme Challenge 54
| 
| align=center| 3
| align=center| 3:00
| Illinois, United States
| 
|-
| Win
| align=center| 15–11
| Rafal Piszczek
| Decision (unanimous)
| EC 54: Extreme Challenge 54
| 
| align=center| 3
| align=center| 5:00
| Illinois, United States
| 
|-
| Loss
| align=center| 14–11
| Chris Lytle
| Decision (unanimous)
| Battleground 1: War Cry
| 
| align=center| 3
| align=center| 5:00
| Illinois, United States
| 
|-
| Win
| align=center| 14–10
| Miguel Menendez
| TKO
| HFC 1: Hardcore Fighting Championships 1
| 
| align=center| 2
| align=center| 0:45
| Massachusetts, United States
| 
|-
| Win
| align=center| 13–10
| Donald Ouimet
| Decision (unanimous)
| UCC Hawaii: Eruption in Hawaii
| 
| align=center| 3
| align=center| 5:00
| Hawaii, United States
| 
|-
| Loss
| align=center| 12–10
| Ryuki Ueyama
| TKO (towel thrown)
| Deep: 3rd Impact
| 
| align=center| 1
| align=center| 5:00
| Tokyo, Japan
| 
|-
| Loss
| align=center| 12–9
| Frank Trigg
| Submission (strikes)
| World Fighting Alliance 1
| 
| align=center| 3
| align=center| 2:15
| Nevada, United States
| 
|-
| Loss
| align=center| 12–8
| Daiju Takase
| Submission (triangle choke)
| Pancrase: 2001 Neo-Blood Tournament Opening Round
| 
| align=center| 2
| align=center| 0:16
| Tokyo, Japan
| 
|-
| Win
| align=center| 12–7
| Earnest Knight
| Submission (strikes)
| Gladiators 16: Gladiators 16
| 
| align=center| 1
| 
| Iowa, United States
| 
|-
| Loss
| align=center| 11–7
| Jutaro Nakao
| Technical Submission (triangle choke)
| HOOKnSHOOT: Masters
| 
| align=center| 3
| align=center| 3:50
| Indiana, United States
| 
|-
| Loss
| align=center| 11–6
| Chatt Lavender
| Submission (armbar)
| Rings USA: Battle of Champions
| 
| align=center| 2
| align=center| 1:04
| Iowa, United States
| 
|-
| Loss
| align=center| 11–5
| Fabiano Iha
| Submission (armbar)
| UFC 27
| 
| align=center| 1
| align=center| 1:10
| Louisiana, United States
| 
|-
| Win
| align=center| 11–4
| Cedric Marks
| Submission (choke)
| EC 35: Extreme Challenge 35
| 
| align=center| 2
| align=center| 3:24
| Iowa, United States
| 
|-
| Win
| align=center| 10–4
| Koji Oishi
| Decision (majority)
| UFC 25
| 
| align=center| 3
| align=center| 5:00
| Yoyogi Gym
| 
|-
| Win
| align=center| 9–4
| John Lewis
| Decision (unanimous)
| WEF 8: Goin' Platinum
| 
| align=center| 3
| align=center| 5:00
| Georgia, United States
| 
|-
| Win
| align=center| 8–4
| John Paun
| TKO (guillotine choke)
| EC 29: Extreme Challenge 29
| 
| align=center| 1
| align=center| 0:45
| Wisconsin, United States
| 
|-
| Loss
| align=center| 7–4
| Matt Hughes
| Submission (rear naked choke)
| EC 29: Extreme Challenge 29
| 
| align=center| 2
| align=center| 1:35
| Wisconsin, United States
| 
|-
| Loss
| align=center| 7–3
| Dave Menne
| Submission (guillotine choke)
| EC 29: Extreme Challenge 29
| 
| align=center| 2
| align=center| 3:18
| Wisconsin, United States
| 
|-
| Win
| align=center| 7–2
| CJ Fernandes
| Submission (injury)
| EC 26: Extreme Challenge 26
| 
| align=center| 1
| align=center| 3:00
| Illinois, United States
| 
|-
| Win
| align=center| 6–2
| Fabiano Iha
| TKO (cut)
| UFC 20
| 
| align=center| 1
| align=center| 1:31
| Alabama, United States
| 
|-
| Win
| align=center| 5–2
| James Julian
| Submission (strikes)
| EB 2: Extreme Boxing 2
| 
| align=center| 1
| align=center| 2:08
| Iowa, United States
| 
|-
| Win
| align=center| 4–2
| Frank Caracci
| Submission (strikes)
| UFC 18
| 
| align=center| 1
| align=center| 6:52
| Louisiana, United States
| 
|-
| Win
| align=center| 3–2
| Dave Yoder
| Submission (rear naked choke)
| EC 20: Extreme Challenge 20
| 
| align=center| 1
| align=center| 4:35
| Iowa, United States
| 
|-
| Win
| align=center| 2–2
| Josh Stewart
| TKO (strikes)
| UFC 16
| 
| align=center| 1
| 
| Louisiana, United States
| 
|-
| Loss
| align=center| 1–2
| Dave Menne
| Submission (triangle choke)
| EC 5: Extreme Challenge 5
| 
| align=center| 1
| align=center| 5:51
| Iowa, United States
| 
|-
| Loss
| align=center| 1–1
| Brian Dunn
| Submission (guillotine choke)
| EC 4: Extreme Challenge 4
| 
| align=center| 1
| align=center| 3:26
| Iowa, United States
| 
|-
| Win
| align=center| 1–0
| Shonie Carter
| KO (punches)
| EC 3: Extreme Challenge 3
| 
| align=center| 1
| align=center| 0:09
| Iowa, United States
|

Professional boxing record

|-
|align="center" colspan=8|14 Wins (9 knockouts, 5 decisions), 18 Losses (15 knockouts, 3 decisions), 1 Draw 
|-
| align="center" style="border-style: none none solid solid; background: #e3e3e3"|Result
| align="center" style="border-style: none none solid solid; background: #e3e3e3"|Record
| align="center" style="border-style: none none solid solid; background: #e3e3e3"|Opponent
| align="center" style="border-style: none none solid solid; background: #e3e3e3"|Type
| align="center" style="border-style: none none solid solid; background: #e3e3e3"|Round
| align="center" style="border-style: none none solid solid; background: #e3e3e3"|Date
| align="center" style="border-style: none none solid solid; background: #e3e3e3"|Location
| align="center" style="border-style: none none solid solid; background: #e3e3e3"|Notes
|-align=center
|Loss
|
|align=left| Allan Green
|TKO
|3
|March 5, 2004
|align=left| Pala Casino Resort and Spa, Pala, California
|align=left|
|-
|Loss
|
|align=left| Tomasz Adamek
|TKO
|3
|October 18, 2002
|align=left| Kozienice
|align=left|
|-
|Loss
|
|align=left| Sammy Merza
|DQ
|2
|June 21, 2002
|align=left| Fiesta Palace, Waukegan, Illinois
|align=left|
|-
|Loss
|
|align=left| Anwar Oshana
|KO
|3
|April 26, 2002
|align=left| Ramada Inn, Rosemont, Illinois
|align=left|
|-
|Win
|
|align=left| Art Davis
|KO
|1
|March 3, 2002
|align=left| Latin American Social Club, Sterling, Illinois
|align=left|
|-
|Loss
|
|align=left| Oscar Bravo
|KO
|2
|November 21, 2001
|align=left| Ramada Inn, Rosemont, Illinois
|align=left|
|-
|Loss
|
|align=left| Gilbert Venegas
|UD
|4
|September 28, 2001
|align=left| Knox County Fairgrounds, Knoxville, Illinois
|align=left|
|-
|Loss
|
|align=left| Kwan Manasseh
|KO
|2
|February 2, 2001
|align=left| Illinois
|align=left|
|-
|Loss
|
|align=left| Kevin Vining
|PTS
|6
|December 1, 2000
|align=left| Minnesota
|align=left|
|-
|Loss
|
|align=left| Charles "The Hatchet" Brewer
|KO
|2
|March 3, 2000
|align=left| Turning Stone Resort & Casino, Verona, New York
|align=left|
|-
|Win
|
|align=left| Donnie Penelton
|UD
|4
|February 17, 2000
|align=left| River Center, Davenport, Iowa
|align=left|
|-
|Loss
|
|align=left| Glen Kelly
|TKO
|6
|November 22, 1999
|align=left| Hurstville Civic Centre, Sydney
|align=left|
|-
|Loss
|
|align=left| Eric Lucas
|KO
|5
|May 28, 1999
|align=left| Molson Centre, Montreal, Quebec
|align=left|
|-
|Win
|
|align=left| Jason Stewarson
|UD
|4
|April 24, 1999
|align=left| Veteran's Coliseum, Cedar Rapids, Iowa
|align=left|
|-
|Win
|
|align=left| Larry Hyatt
|KO
|1
|March 23, 1999
|align=left| Vic Ferrari's, Davenport, Iowa
|align=left|
|-
|Loss
|
|align=left| Ali Supreme
|TKO
|5
|February 5, 1999
|align=left| Chicago Racquet Club, Chicago, Illinois
|align=left|
|-
|Win
|
|align=left| Harold Johnson
|TKO
|1
|January 20, 1999
|align=left| Lady Luck Casino, Davenport, Iowa
|align=left|
|-
|Loss
|
|align=left| "Fabulous" Fred Moore
|KO
|4
|October 1, 1998
|align=left| Rochester, Minnesota
|align=left|
|-
|Win
|
|align=left| Aníbal Santiago Acevedo
|TKO
|1
|September 19, 1998
|align=left| Moca, Puerto Rico
|align=left|
|-
|Win
|
|align=left| Leon Shavers
|TKO
|1
|August 29, 1998
|align=left| Waterloo, Iowa
|align=left|
|-
|Loss
|
|align=left| Thomas Ulrich
|KO
|2
|May 2, 1998
|align=left| Hansehalle, Lübeck, Schleswig-Holstein
|align=left|
|-
|Loss
|
|align=left| Peter H Madsen
|TKO
|3
|March 20, 1998
|align=left| Vejby-Risskov Hallen, Aarhus
|align=left|
|-
|Loss
|
|align=left| Randie Carver
|TKO
|5
|December 13, 1997
|align=left| Amphitheater, Pompano Beach, Florida
|align=left|
|-
|Win
|
|align=left| Nino Cirilo
|PTS
|6
|October 4, 1997
|align=left| Rochester, Minnesota
|align=left|
|-
|Draw
|
|align=left| Anthony Bonsante
|PTS
|6
|September 13, 1997
|align=left| Mandan, North Dakota
|align=left|
|-
|Win
|
|align=left| Wilfred Ash
|KO
|1
|June 6, 1997
|align=left| Winnipeg, Manitoba
|align=left|
|-
|Loss
|
|align=left| Thomas Hansvoll
|TKO
|4
|May 2, 1997
|align=left| Randers Hallen, Randers
|align=left|
|-
|Win
|
|align=left| Tyrone Bledsoe
|TKO
|2
|April 12, 1997
|align=left| Dubuque Fairgrounds, Dubuque, Iowa
|align=left|
|-
|Loss
|
|align=left| Mike Winklejohn
|TKO
|2
|April 9, 1997
|align=left| Inland Expo Center, Westmont, Illinois
|align=left|
|-
|Win
|
|align=left| Darrin Wagner
|TKO
|3
|March 28, 1997
|align=left| Rochester, Minnesota
|align=left|
|-
|Win
|
|align=left| Tyrone Bledsoe
|KO
|1
|November 30, 1996
|align=left| Latin Club, Sterling, Illinois
|align=left|
|-
|Win
|
|align=left| Tony Golden
|UD
|4
|September 28, 1996
|align=left| Lady Luck Casino, Davenport, Iowa
|align=left|
|-
|Win
|
|align=left| Marris Virgil
|MD
|4
|June 16, 1996
|align=left| Lady Luck Casino, Davenport, Iowa
|align=left|
|}

References

External links
 
 
 

American male mixed martial artists
Mixed martial artists from Iowa
Welterweight mixed martial artists
Mixed martial artists utilizing boxing
Mixed martial artists utilizing wrestling
Boxers from Iowa
Light-heavyweight boxers
Living people
1973 births
American male boxers
Ultimate Fighting Championship male fighters